The London Cuckolds is a 1681 comedy play by the English writer Edward Ravenscroft.

It was performed at the Dorset Garden Theatre by the Duke's Company. The original cast included Cave Underhill as Wiseacre, James Nokes as Doodle, Joseph Williams as Townly, John Wiltshire as Loveday, William Smith as Ramble, Anthony Leigh as Dashwell, John Richards as Tom, Elizabeth Currer as Eugenia, Elizabeth Barry as Arabella, Elinor Leigh as Engine and Margaret Osborne as Jane.

References

Bibliography
 Van Lennep, W. The London Stage, 1660-1800: Volume One, 1660-1700. Southern Illinois University Press, 1960.

1681 plays
West End plays
Restoration comedy
Plays by Edward Ravenscroft